William Patrick Adam, CIE, DL (14 September 1823 – 24 May 1881) was a British colonial administrator and Liberal politician. He was twice First Commissioner of Works under William Gladstone and also served briefly as Governor of Madras between 1880 and 1881.

Background and education
Adam was the son of Admiral Sir Charles Adam, son of William Adam, only surviving son of the architect John Adam, brother of architects Robert Adam and James Adam. His mother was Elizabeth Brydone, daughter of Patrick Brydone, while John Adam and Sir Frederick Adam were his uncles. He was educated at Rugby and Trinity College, Cambridge, and was called to the Bar, Inner Temple, in 1849.

Political career
Adam was secretary to the Governor of Bombay, Lord Elphinstone (his second cousin), from 1853 to 1858. In 1859 he was elected Member of Parliament for Clackmannan and Kinross, a seat he held until 1880. He served as a Lord of the Treasury under Lord Palmerston and Lord Russell from 1865 to 1866 and under Gladstone from 1868 to 1873. In August 1873 he was sworn of the Privy Council and appointed First Commissioner of Works by Gladstone. In September of the same year he was given the additional post of Paymaster-General, and retained both offices until the fall of the Gladstone government in February 1874.

Between 1874 and 1880 Adam was a Liberal whip. When the Liberals returned to power under Gladstone in May 1880, he was once again made First Commissioner of Works. In December 1880 he was appointed Governor of Madras, which he remained until his death in May of the following year.

Adam was also the author of Thoughts on Policy of Retaliation and served as a Deputy Lieutenant of Kinross-shire and Fife.

Personal life
Adam married Emily, daughter of General Sir William Wyllie, in 1856. They had several children. Adam died in May 1881, aged 57, in Ooty, British India, where he was also buried. His wife Emily was awarded the Order of the Crown of India in October 1881. In 1882 their eldest son Charles Adam was created a baronet, of Blair Adam in the County of Kinross, in honour of his father (see Adam baronets) and the same year Emily Adam was granted the precedence of a baronet's wife. She died in November 1906.

References

External links

1823 births
1881 deaths
Scottish Liberal Party MPs
Members of the Privy Council of the United Kingdom
Members of the Parliament of the United Kingdom for Scottish constituencies
UK MPs 1859–1865
UK MPs 1865–1868
UK MPs 1868–1874
UK MPs 1874–1880
Governors of Madras
Companions of the Order of the Indian Empire
Deputy Lieutenants of Kinross-shire
Deputy Lieutenants of Fife
Members of the Inner Temple